The Islamization of the Temple Mount is the historical process by which Muslim authorities have sought to adapt the Temple Mount for Muslim use. Once an Israelite and subsequently Jewish holy site, as the location of the Second Temple, the site was subsequently the location of a Roman pagan temple, a Byzantine public building, possibly a church, a garbage dump, and later the Dome of the Rock and the Al-Aqsa Mosque. The Temple Mount is the holiest site in Judaism, and the third holiest in Sunni Islam.

Early Muslim period

During his excavations in the 1930s, Robert Hamilton uncovered portions of a multicolor mosaic floor with geometric patterns inside the al-Aqsa mosque, but didn't publish them. The date of the mosaic is disputed: Zachi Dvira considers that they are from the pre-Islamic Byzantine period, while Baruch, Reich and Sandhaus favor a much later Umayyad origin on account of their similarity to a known Umayyad mosaic.

The Islamization of the Temple Mount climaxed at the end of the seventh century, with the construction of the Dome of the Rock in the early 690s when Abd al-Malik was developing his program of Islamization. It was built over the Foundation Stone, the site of the historic Jewish Temple. The al-Aqsa mosque was built at the southern end of the mount in the 8th century. Throughout the entire period of the Early Muslim period, from the Muslim conquest until the Crusader capture of Jerusalem in 1099, various structures were built on the mount including memorial sites and gates.

Crusades and counter-Crusade
The Temple Mount, along with the entire Holy Land, changed hands several times during the Crusader period (1099-1244 for Jerusalem), Christians and Muslims rededicating its buildings to their own religious and power needs every time they managed to wrangle control over them from their respective enemies.

Mamluk and Ottoman periods
From the 13th-century onwards, after the Muslims had regained control of the city, building projects in Jerusalem and around the Temple Mount sought to further establish the city's Islamic character.

Post-1967

In 1990, the waqf began construction of a series of outdoor minbar (pulpits) to create open-air prayer areas for use on popular holy days. A monument to the victims of the Sabra and Shatila massacre was also erected. In 1996, the Waqf began underground construction of the new el-Marwani Mosque in the southeastern corner of the Temple Mount. The area was claimed by the waqf as a space that served in earlier Islamic periods as a place of prayer, but some saw the move as a part of a "political agenda" and a "pretext" for the Islamization of the underground space, and believed it had been instigated to prevent the site being used a synagogue for Jewish prayers. A spate over the use of the Golden Gate (Bab adh-Dhahabi) gatehouse as a mosque has followed in 2019.

See also

References

External links
 Video of renovations (English)

Temple Mount
Islam in Jerusalem
Temple Mount